Filin may refer to:

 Filin (music), a Cuban song fashion of the mid 20th century
 Filin class guard ship, a class of ships 
 Filin (surname)